Khotyn Raion was an administrative raion (district) in the southern part of Chernivtsi Oblast in western Ukraine, on the Romanian border. It was part of the historical region of Bessarabia. The administrative center was the city of Khotyn. The raion was abolished on 18 July 2020 as part of the administrative reform of Ukraine, which reduced the number of raions of Chernivtsi Oblast to three. The area of Khotyn Raion was merged into Dnistrovskyi Raion. The last estimate of the raion population was 

At the time of disestablishment, the raion consisted of eight hromadas:
 Khotyn urban hromada with the administration in Khotyn;
 Klishkivtsi rural hromada with the administration in the selo of Klishkivtsi;
 Nedoboivtsi rural hromada with the administration in the selo of Nedoboivtsi;
 Rukshyn rural hromada with the administration in the selo of Rukshyn.

Three villages, Kolinkivtsi, Hrozyntsi, and Bochkivtsi, belonged to Toporyvtsi rural hromada, mainly based in Novoselytsia Raion. After the reform, they were transferred to Chernivtsi Raion.

See also
Subdivisions of Ukraine

References

External links
 Web page on the website of Regional State Administration 

Former raions of Chernivtsi Oblast
1940 establishments in Ukraine
Ukrainian raions abolished during the 2020 administrative reform